Serena Altschul (born October 13, 1970) is an American broadcast journalist, known for her work at MTV News and CBS.

Early life and education
Altschul was born in New York City, a daughter of author and botanist Siri von Reis and Arthur Altschul, a member of the Lehman banking family. Her mother was of half-Finnish and half-Swedish ancestry and her father was of Jewish ancestry. After her parents divorced, two-year-old Serena and two siblings were raised by their mother.

Altschul has four siblings. Her brother, Arthur Goodhart Altschul Jr., was married to journalist Rula Jebreal and her sister, Emily Altschul, is married to former journalist and NYPD Deputy Commissioner John Miller. She also has two half-brothers, Charles Altschul and mathematician Stephen Altschul from her father's previous marriage and a step-brother, Whitney Sudler-Smith, from her father's later marriage to reality television series personality Patricia Dey.

Altschul attended Scripps College for a few years, studying English literature, but did not graduate. In 1993, while still in college, she was the associate producer of The Last Party, a political documentary.

Career
After school, she worked for two years at Channel One News, a channel seen nationwide in high schools, as an anchor/reporter. In 1987 she landed a job at MTV and in January 1996 she started working for MTV News. She also hosted shows such as MTV News: UNfiltered, Breaking it Down and hosted and produced True Life. From 2002 to 2003 Altschul worked at CNN. She hosted and produced a CNN special on the return of PCP. She continued working at MTV News while at CNN. On December 23, 2003, she was named a CBS News contributing correspondent. Since 2013 she has appeared on CBS Sunday Morning.

She played herself on Jay-Z's 1999 song, "Dope Man". She also appeared as herself in the films Queen of the Damned and Josie and the Pussycats.

Awards
Edward R. Murrow Award – Sports Reporting 2007

References

External links 

Charlie Rose interview February 8, 2000
CBS News profile for Altschul
Serena Altschul reports on Wikipedia

1970 births
Living people
Television personalities from New York City
American television reporters and correspondents
American people of Finnish descent
American people of German-Jewish descent
American people of Swedish descent
American women television journalists
Scripps College alumni
Lehman family
CBS News people
CNN people
Spence School alumni